The Tuberculosis Hospital of Pittsburgh in the Hill District neighborhood of Pittsburgh, Pennsylvania, is a complex of eight buildings, with the first building completed in 1912.  It was listed on the National Register of Historic Places in 1993.

References

Hospital buildings completed in 1912
Hospital buildings on the National Register of Historic Places in Pennsylvania
Hospitals in Pittsburgh
Tuberculosis sanatoria in the United States
1912 establishments in Pennsylvania
Historic districts on the National Register of Historic Places in Pennsylvania
National Register of Historic Places in Pittsburgh